A Twenty20 International (T20I) is an international cricket match between two representative teams, each having T20I status, as determined by the International Cricket Council (ICC), and is played under the rules of Twenty20 cricket. The first such match was played between Australia and New Zealand on 17 February 2005. A Twenty20 International can have three possible results: it can be won by one of the two teams, it could be tied, or it could be declared to have "no result". For a match to finish as a tie, both teams must have scored the same number of runs. The number of wickets lost is not considered. Although such matches are recorded as ties, a tiebreak is usually played; prior to December 2008, this was a bowl-out, and since then it has been a Super Over.

The first tied T20I occurred in 2006, between New Zealand and the West Indies. Hosted at Eden Park in Auckland, it was the fifth T20I. The crowd had started to leave the stadium, disappointed with the result, when the bowl-out was announced; the 2007 Wisden Cricketers' Almanack reported that "suddenly the evening took a madcap turn." The next tie, involving India and Pakistan, happened during the group stages of the 2007 ICC World Twenty20. India won the resulting bowl-out, and were awarded two points, the equivalent of a win. In October 2008, the tie between Canada and Zimbabwe was the final international match to be decided by a bowl-out; Zimbabwe won 3–1. Two months later, New Zealand and the West Indies took part in the first Super Over in an international. The West Indies won the eliminator by scoring 25 runs in their extra over, compared to New Zealand's 15.

On 17 June 2018, a T20I between Scotland and Ireland was ended in a tie, though no Super Over was played. It was the tenth T20I match to end in a tie, and the first since the ICC playing conditions were implemented in September 2017, not to end with a Super Over. However, both teams knew that there would not be a Super Over in the event of a tie before the match. The International Cricket Council (ICC) confirmed that there should have been a Super Over, and apologised for the oversight. On 21 April 2021, a rain-curtailed  T20I match between Malaysia and the Netherlands was ended in a tie, again no Super Over was played due to the lost time.

 there have been 24 tied Twenty20 Internationals. Every Test-playing nation except Bangladesh has been involved in a tied T20I. New Zealand have played in the most, nine, and on three of those instances they were facing the West Indies and on three other instances they were facing India . Three of the ties have taken place during ICC World Twenty20 tournaments, including two during the 2012 tournament.

Tied matches

By teams

By grounds

See also
 Tied Test
 List of tied first-class cricket matches
 List of tied One Day Internationals

Notes

References

Twenty20 cricket lists
Twenty20 International cricket
Lists of cricket matches